There were 6 Formula One drivers from Rhodesia (both Northern Rhodesia and Southern Rhodesia, which from 1953 to 1963 existed as one country, Federation of Rhodesia and Nyasaland, before breaking down into individual countries again), with 3 of them having started in races.

Drivers

Timeline

References